The Claw may refer to:

 The Claw (1918 film), an American silent film
 The Claw (1927 film), an American silent film
 The Claw (Dick Tracy), a fictional character in the Dick Tracy film serial Dick Tracy's Dilemma
 The Claw (Lev Gleason Publications), a fictional golden-age comic book villain
 The Claw (Dreamworld), an Intamin Gyro Swing located at Dreamworld on the Gold Coast, Queensland, Australia
 "The Claw", a guitar instrumental composition by Jerry Reed
 The Claw (University of South Florida), a golf and cross country course
 White Memorial Fountain, nicknamed The Claw, a fountain at Stanford University that resembles a claw
"The Claw" (Bluey), an episode of the first season of the animated TV series Bluey

People
 Jorge Luis Mendoza Cárdenas, Mexican suspected drug lord nicknamed "la Garra" ("the Claw")
 Peter Clohessy (born 1966), Irish former rugby union footballer nicknamed "the Claw"

See also
 Kawhi Leonard (born 1991), American basketball player nicknamed "the Klaw"
 Claw crane, a type of mechanical arcade game
 Claw (disambiguation)